Kooyong may refer to:

 Kooyong, Victoria, a suburb of Melbourne
 Division of Kooyong, an electoral district in the Australian House of Representatives in Victoria
 Kooyong Classic, tennis event held at Kooyong Stadium
 Kooyong Stadium, tennis venue in the suburb